The 2013 season of the FFAS Senior League was the thirty-three season of association football competition in American Samoa. SKBC won the championship, their first recorded title.

Format
Eight teams competed in the league. The top team became the champion. Seventh place played in a relegation playoff against the second place finisher from division 2. Last place was automatically relegated, replaced by division 2 winner.

Table

References

External links
 Standings at FIFA.com

FFAS Senior League seasons
Amer
football